The Paracel Islands, also known as the Xisha Islands and the Hoang Sa Archipelago, are a disputed archipelago in the South China Sea.

The archipelago includes about 130 small coral islands and reefs, most grouped into the northeastern Amphitrite Group or the western Crescent Group. The name Paracel is of Portuguese origin, and appears on 16th-century Portuguese maps. The archipelago is approximately equidistant from the coastlines of the People's Republic of China (PRC) and Vietnam, and approximately one-third of the way from central Vietnam to the northern Philippines. The archipelago includes Dragon Hole, the deepest underwater sinkhole in the world. Turtles and seabirds are native to the islands, which have a hot and humid climate, abundant rainfall and frequent typhoons. The archipelago is surrounded by productive fishing grounds and a seabed with potential, but as yet unexplored, oil and gas reserves.

The colonial government of French Indochina set up telecommunication and weather stations on Pattle Island in the Crescent Group and Woody Island ('Boisée' in French) in the Amphitrite Group in the 1930s, which they regularly supplied until 1945. Imperial Japan established a military presence on the Paracel Islands during the Second Sino-Japanese War, and Japanese troops lived alongside French troops on Woody Island throughout much of the war. After the end of the war, in 1946, the Republic of China sent naval expeditions to the South China Sea and established a garrison on Woody Island. Later, in January 1947, French and Vietnamese forces landed on Pattle Island in the Crescent Group. By 1955, South Vietnam had taken possession of the Crescent Group. In 1956, the PRC took control of and established a permanent presence on Woody Island, which by then was only seasonally inhabited by fishermen from Hainan. After the Battle of the Paracel Islands in January 1974, the PRC expelled the South Vietnamese from the Crescent Group and took full control of the Paracels. South Vietnam's claim to the islands was inherited by the Socialist Republic of Vietnam, which has ruled all of Vietnam since 1975.

The ownership of the islands remains hotly contested. People's Republic of China on Mainland China, Vietnam, and Republic of China on Taiwan all claim de jure sovereignty, although the PRC has de facto control of the islands. In July 2012, China (PRC) established Sansha, Hainan Province, as administering the area. In February 2017, the Asia Maritime Transparency Initiative reported 20 outposts of the PRC built on reclaimed land in the Paracels, three of which have small harbors capable of berthing naval and commercial ships.

Geography 

 Geographic coordinates: 
 Coastline: 
 Climate: tropical
 Elevation extremes:
 Lowest point: South China Sea, sea level
 Highest point: unnamed location on Rocky Island 
 Natural resources: fish, coral reefs, possible reserves of oil and gas of unknown size
 Natural hazards: typhoons

Climate

Amphitrite group 

The Amphitrite group was named after the French frigate Amphitrite, which observed the islands while carrying a Jesuit mission to Canton in 1698–1700.

The northern section of the group comprises West Sand, Tree Island and the Qilian Yu sub-group (The "Seven Sisters": North Island, Middle Island, South Island, North Sand, Middle Sand, South Sand and two small "sands".) The southwest corner of the group is occupied by the Iltis Bank.

The largest island of the Paracels, Woody Island (which has an area of ), has over 1,000 residents including fishermen and their families, military personnel and civilian administrators.

Crescent group 

All of the islands in the group support vegetation except on their small cays.

The islands are named after former senior figures in the British East India Company (EIC). Three were members of the EIC's 'Select Committee' in Canton: James Drummond, Thomas Pattle and John William Roberts. Jonathan Duncan was Governor in Council of Bombay, and William Taylor Money was Superintendent of the Bombay Marine.

Money Island lies at the southwest extremity of the group, and has some small cays on the southern side. The Chinese name for Money Island, Jin Yin Dao, is simply the translation of the English name.
A weather station was built on Pattle Island (by the French) in 1932, and a lighthouse and radio station in 1937.
Northeast of this is Quanfu Dao ("All Wealth Island").
Observation Bank, also named Silver Islet, and the Lesser Silver Islet, are the northernmost of the group and contain a small cay.
Just south of them are Yagong Dao (He Duck) and Xianshe Yu (Salty Hut).

Near the centre of the reef is Dragon Hole  the deepest known sinkhole in the world.

Kuangzai Shazhou (Little Basket) lies about halfway between Palm Island and Antelope Reef.

Other features 
Taking  as the center of the Paracel Islands, then the Amphitrite Group is ENE, and the Crescent Group is West.

Southeast
Bombay Reef encloses a deep lagoon with rocks on its edge.

Eastern sub-group
 Jehangire Bank: East of the Bremen Bank at 
 Neptuna Bank: North of the Bremen Bank at 
 Pyramid Rock: NE of the Neptuna Bank at 
The depth increases sharply on the northern and eastern sides of the island but the southern and south western regions are shallow. An observation post on the western side was found by officers of the German government surveys in 1883. In 1948, Great Britain requested France for permission to use the feature for military exercises.

Northeast
 Dido Bank: Separate from, and NE of, the Eastern sub-group at

(ENE: Ampitrite group)

Northwest
Most parts of the reef are submerged. There are rugged rocks are around the edge that are barely above water. There is a passage into the lagoon on the southwestern side of the reef.

(West: Crescent group)

Inner southwest
Completely submerged, the elongated ring structure is the largest single reef in the Paracel Islands. The reef has two large, deep openings into the lagoon on its southern side.
The sand cay measures  in length.

Outer southwest

Central
Some small spiral rocks are to be seen on the reef.

List of entities

Satellite images

Etymology

Hoàng Sa 
The Vietnamese call the islands Hoang Sa, (黃沙 or Yellow Sands), and this name is found in historic Vietnamese documents dating back to 1483, included "An Nam quốc họa đồ" which was published in 1490. In the modern language system it is written as Hoàng Sa or Cát Vàng. They all have the same meaning — the Yellow Sands or the Yellow Sandbank. Before the early 19th century, the present-day Spratly Islands were treated as features of Hoàng Sa. It was not until the reign of Emperor Minh Mạng (1820–1841) that the Spratlys were distinctly delineated and officially named Vạn Lý Trường Sa (萬里長沙), the Ten-thousand League-long Sandbank.

Xisha and other Chinese names 

The Chinese name Xisha, literally "western sands" or "shoals", is a name adopted in the 20th century to distinguish it from the "eastern sands" (Pratas; also Tungsha/Dongsha), the "southern sands" (the Nansha or Spratlys), and the "central sands" (the Zhongsha or Macclesfield Bank).  Prior to that, there had been no consistent designation of these islands in early Chinese sources, with names such as Changsha, Shitang, Shichuang and others being used for Paracel and Spratly inconsistently.   In the 14th century Song Dynasty work Zhu fan zhi by Zhao Rugua, the names Qianli Changsha (  "Thousand mile-Long Sands") and Wanli Shichuang (  "Ten-thousand mile-Rock Bed") were given, interpreted by some to refer to Paracel and Spratly respectively, but opinions differed.   The Yuan dynasty work Daoyi Zhilüe by Wang Dayuan considers that Shitang (石塘) to be the same as Wanli Shitang ( "Ten-thousand mile-Rock Embankment"), which starts from Chaozhou and extends to Borneo, west to Côn Sơn Island off Vietnam and down as far as Java.  The History of Yuan uses the terms Qizhouyang (七洲洋, "The Ocean of Seven Islands") and Wanli Shitang, which are taken to mean Paracel and Spratly respectively.  In the Mao Kun map from the Zheng He's voyage of the early 15th century, groups of islands were named as Shitang (石塘), Wansheng Shitangyu (萬生石塘嶼), and Shixing Shitang (石星石塘), with Shitang (sometimes including Wansheng Shitangyu) being taken by some to mean Paracel.  Another Ming text, Haiyu (On the Sea), uses  Wanli Shitang to refer to Paracel and Wanli Changsha for Spratly.

During the Qing dynasty, a set of maps refer to Paracel as Qizhouyang (Shitang became Spratly, and Changsha became Zhongsha), while a book Hai Lu (Illustrations of the Sea) refers to Paracel as Changsha  and Spratly as Shitang.  A sea chart prepared in the Daoguang era, Yiban Lu (Particular Illustrations) by Zheng Guangzu, uses Xisha to refer to Paracel.  Xisha became the standard name used in China in the 20th century, and was used in 20th century maps published by the Republic of China, for example in 1935, and the 1947 11-dash line map which claimed Paracel and Spratly as its territories.

Pracel and Paracel 

The name 'Paracel' is found in the first Portuguese maps of the region. The Portuguese, whose vessels frequented the South China Sea as early as at the beginning of the 16th century, were the first to refer to these islands as 'Ilhas do Pracel' in the 16th century.

The Portuguese were later followed by the Dutch, the English, the Spanish, and the French in the waters of the island group. On the "Map of the coast of Tonquin and Cochinchina", made in 1747 by Pierre d'Hondt, the dangerous band of rugged rocks was labeled "Le Paracel", a French phonetic notation. Because of their location on an important seaborne route the Paracel Islands drew much attention from navigators and hydrographers in the Age of Exploration. Disputes in the area since the Second World War have again drawn attention to the islands.

On the "Map of Europe, Africa and Asia" published in 1598 by Cornelis Claesz, an unnamed band of rocks and sandbanks are shown near the present-day location of the Paracel and Spratly Islands. About two decades later, the names Pracel and Costa de Pracel (Coast of Pracel) appeared on the Chart of Asia and eight city maps published in 1617 by Willem Jansz Blaeu, a Dutch map maker. The coast belonged to the Kingdom of Cauchi China.

East India Company 
The islands were first scientifically surveyed by Daniel Ross of the British East India Company in 1808. The names of Duncan, Drummond, Money, Pattle and Roberts islands were all chosen in honor of senior figures in the East India Company.

Infrastructure and natural resources

Infrastructure 
China has historically had a presence in the islands and, as of 2016, was engaged in major infrastructure development to support its territorial claims over the archipelago, and as a result there has been, and continues to be, a lot of construction activity. In recent years Woody Island has acquired an upgraded airport, an upgraded sea port, and a city hall. There is a post office, hospital and a school on Woody Island.

Fresh water 
There is limited supply of fresh water on the islands. In 2012, it was reported that China (PRC) planned to build a solar-energy-powered desalination plant on the islands. In 2016, it was reported that the first desalination plant was activated. This reduces the occupant's reliance on water supply coming in barrels by boat.

Electricity 
Both wind and solar powered facilities exist, but most of the electricity is supplied by diesel generators. This led to considerations by the Chinese government to use floating nuclear power plants. It was reported in October 2020 that an experimental wave power generator was installed off Woody Island.

On land, in August 2020, Millennium Energy Viêtnam Co., Ltd, a member of Millennium Petroleum Corporation announced plans to develop a 600 ha, US$15 billion LNG project in the south Vân Phong area of the Khánh Hòa province, i.e. Nha Trang, near by Cam Ranh, with capacity of 9,600 MW, project which include a dock warehouse system, may be terminals, to provide gas to the power plant as well as distribute LNG in South-East Asia, supplied presumably by the offshore gas deposit along the coast of Quảng Nam province, discovered by ExxonMobil in October 2011, at 200 nautical miles (roughly 370 km), amid the area disputed by China (PRC), surrounded the Paracel
Islands, in Chinese maritime border sovereignty claimed by Beijing (refer to "Battle of the Paracel Islands"). Trung Nam Group also announced in early April 2021, a wind power 900 ha complex US$174 million with capacity of 423 GW/h/year, directly connected to the country's grid through Tháp Chàm 220 kV transformer station.

Communication 
The Chinese postal zip code of the island is 572000, and the telephone area code is +86 (898). There is cellphone reception on the island.

Transport 
Flight services operate on the Haikou – Xisha route. Extensive port facilities have been constructed on Duncan Island.

Ecology and tourism 
Paracel Islands' geographical and ecological traits are often likened as "China's Maldives", however, controversial conflicts between environment conservation and human activities including military operations, developments, and tourism on Paracel Islands have become public concerns in recent years. Local ecosystem include endangered fish such as whale sharks, oceanic birds, marine mammals (at least historically) such as blue whales, fin whales, and Chinese white dolphins, and marine reptile species such as critically endangered green sea turtles, hawksbill sea turtles, and Leatherback sea turtles; however, direct damaging of the ecosystem by military group and tourists has been documented. Governmental actions to cease illegal tourism are ongoing.

The islands have been open for tourists since 1997. Chinese tourists can take a 20-hour ferry to the Islands, paying up to US$2,000 for a 5-day cruise, and are placed on a long waitlist before being accepted. The BBC article states that "Chinese tourism has strong political implications, as the Chinese tourists are being used as 'foot soldiers of China' by Beijing to further China's territorial claims there".  The video also states "Vietnam is considered unlikely to send military vessels to stop them".

There are two museums on Woody Island; a Naval Museum and a Maritime Museum. In April 2012, the Vice-Mayor and officials from the Haikou Municipal Government made several announcements about developing new docking facilities and hotels within the Crescent Group - on Duncan and Drummond Islands specifically. Promotion of the naturally unspoilt reef system was cited as the driver for new tourism potential with other such reefs, such as the Great Barrier Reef in Australia, now placed under threat of extinction due to human activities. However, according to The China Post, this was denied by a PRC Government official in April 2012, due to sensitivities surrounding the islands.

Territorial disputes and their historical background 

After the 1884–1885 Sino-French War, in an international context, France officially gained control of Annam and Tonkin as protectorates and fully established French colonial rule in Vietnam by signing a number of treaties with the Chinese and Vietnamese governments including Tientsin Accord, Treaty of Huế (1884) and Treaty of Tientsin (1885). Article 2 of the Treaty of Tientsin (1885) forced China to stop any claims to suzerainty all over Vietnam. Therefore, the French also took over the control of the Paracel Islands which were under the Nguyễn dynasty's administration, still nominally ruled Annam at the time.

Between 1881 and 1883 the German navy surveyed the islands continuously for three months each year without seeking the permission of either France or China. No protest was issued by either government and the German government published the results of the survey in 1885. In 1932, France nonetheless formally claimed both the Paracel and Spratly Islands.  China and Japan both protested.  In 1933, France seized the Paracels and Spratlys, announced their annexation, formally included them in French Indochina, and built a couple of weather stations on them, but did not disturb the numerous Chinese fishermen it found there.  In 1941, the Japanese Empire made the Paracel and Spratly islands part of Taiwan, then under its rule.

The Paracels and Spratlys were handed over to the Republic of China control after the 1945 surrender of Japan, since the Allied powers had assigned the Republic of China to receive Japanese surrenders in that area. At the end of the war (Asian-Pacific Region), Nationalist China formally retook the Paracels, Spratlys, and other islands in the South China Sea in October and November 1946. In the Geneva accord of 1954 Japan formally renounced all of its claims to, inter alia, the South China Sea islands that it had occupied during World War II. After WW2 ended, the Republic of China was the "most active claimant". The Republic of China then garrisoned Woody Island in the Paracels in 1946 and posted Chinese flags and markers on it; France tried, but failed, to make them leave Woody island. The aim of the Republic of China was to block the French claims. In December 1947, the Republic of China drew up a map showing its eleven-dotted line U shaped claim to the entire South China Sea, including the Spratly and Paracel Islands as Chinese territory.

After the communists gained control of China in 1949, they occupied Woody Island, the main island of the Amphitrite group and the only island that was occupied at the time. Pattle Island in the Crescent group, on the other hand, was taken by French Indochina and then controlled by South Vietnam following independence in 1956. Tensions over the islands have continued to rise unceasingly since then.

UNCLOS EEZ
The Paracel islands are claimed by both China and Vietnam and the majority of those islands lie within 200 NM of both China's and Vietnam's geographic baselines under the Law of the Sea.

Historical perspectives

Vietnam

15th–17th centuries 

 1460–1497, under the reign of Emperor Lê Thánh Tông of the Lê dynasty (1428–1789), the Vietnamese began conducting commercial activities on and around Hoàng Sa, including harvesting abundant sea-products and conducting salvage operations on shipwrecks.
 In 1634, during year fifth of Emperor Đức Long of Vietnam (1629–1635), the ship Grootebroek of the Dutch East India Company sank in the vicinity of the Paracel archipelago. Using a small boat, captain Huijch Jansen and 12 sailors managed to reach Đàng Trong, territory of Lord Nguyễn Phúc Nguyên (1613–1635), to seek rescue for other castaways still on the islands.
 1680–1705, Lord Trịnh Căn of Tonkin instructed Đỗ Bá Công Đạo to publish Thiên Nam tứ chí lộ đồ (天南四至路圖), an encyclopedia consisting of four series of maps that detail routes from Thăng Long, capital of Đại Việt, to other countries in Southeast Asia. Part of this work was based on the Hồng Đức Atlas (Hồng Đức Bản Đồ) developed during the time of Emperor Lê Thánh Tông (1460–1497). This encyclopedia was considered one of the oldest and rarely preserved Vietnamese documents regarding the islands. The volume "Đường từ phủ Phụng Thiên đến Chiêm Thành" (The Route to Champa from Phụng Thiên Province), remarkably described the archipelago with maps. For instance, a statement found in the volume read "In the middle of the sea, there is a long sandbank called Bãi Cát Vàng, which is approximately 400-league long and 20-league wide rising up above the sea." Bãi Cát Vàng means Hoàng Sa, Golden Sandbank.
 In the 18th century, under instructions of the Nguyễn lords, the salvage operations officially started with the formation of Hoàng Sa and Bắc Hải Companies. Their responsibility was to carry out the mission at Hoàng Sa (Golden Sandbank) and Vạn Lý Trường Sa (Ten-thousand-league Long Sandbank) respectively. This effort was continued thereafter with successive establishments of other naval task units in accordance with strategic policies toward the two archipelagos under the Nguyễn dynasty. Noticeably, a number of naval battles between the Dutch fleet and the Nguyễn Royal Navy occurred in 1643 and 1644. The Hoàng Sa naval task unit consisted of 70 men recruited from An Vĩnh and An Hải villages of Quảng Ngãi, while the majority of members of the Bắc Hải Company came from Bình Thuận province.

1700–1799 
 In 1776, the Phủ Biên Tạp Lục (撫邊雜錄), the Miscellaneous Records on the Pacification of the Frontiers, published by Lê Quý Đôn, a philosopher, an encyclopedist, and a Minister of Construction during the Lê dynasty (1428–1789). These six volumes detail the Nguyễn dynasty's territories, including the exploitation of the Paracel and Spratly Islands from 1702 onwards.
 1777–1784, when traveling to Cochinchina, Father Jean-Baptiste Grosier recorded his impression about maritime activities of the Vietnamese from Huế, Đà Nẵng, and Quảng Ngãi. The abbot Grosier wrote that the people from those ports were excellent and cleverest navigators in this Kingdom. One of their activities was making long-distance sailing every year to the long chain of islands and rocks known as the Paracels to collect debris from shipwrecks.

1800–1899 

 1802–1820, under the reign of Emperor Gia Long, the territory of his kingdom included Tonkin, Cochin China, part of Cambodia, and "certain islands off the coast including the well known Paracels which bear such an evil reputation as a source of danger to navigation in the China Seas."
 In 1807, the East India Company sent Captain Daniel Ross to Cochinchina to survey the Paracel Islands. Upon arriving to the kingdom, he presented a letter of introduction entrusted by the English company to the reigning king, who was believed to be Emperor Gia Long at that time. Subsequently, Captain Ross completed chartering the south coast of China in 1807, the Paracel Islands in 1808, part of the coast of Cochin China in 1809, and the coast of Palawan in 1810. Most notably, in his surveys published in 1821 under the title "(South) China Sea, Sheet I & II", the Spratly Islands was referred to as The Dangerous Ground and was later renamed as Storm Island on the 1859 edition of the chart. Separately, in another document, the "Correct Chart of the China Sea", published by Herbert in 1758, the Paracel archipelago was described as a long group of islands and reefs extending from 13 to 17 degrees North, which approximately correspond to the geographic latitudes of the present-day Spratly and Paracel Islands, respectively. It is quite clearly that the captain himself, and probably most navigators of his time, did not differentiate the two archipelagos, but instead had delineated the present-day Spratly Islands as part of the Paracels. Captain Daniel Ross was a well known hydrographer of the Navy of Government of English Bengal and founder of the Bombay Geographical Society.
 In 1815, Emperor Gia Long ordered Phạm Quang Anh's Hoàng Sa naval task unit to sail to the islands to make surveys and report on maritime routes and draw up maps.
 In 1816, according to Jean-Baptiste Chaigneau, Emperor Gia Long officially claimed the sovereignty of the Paracel Islands, which would include the present-day Spratly archipelago. These two islands were later delineated distinctly under the reign of his successor, Emperor Minh Mạng. Chaigneau was one of the most respected advisors to Emperor Gia Long. He spent more than 30 years in Cochinchina and became the first French Consul to this kingdom in 1821.
 In 1821, the Lịch triều hiến chương loại chí (歷朝憲章類誌) published by Phan Huy Chú, a historian, an encyclopedist, and an officer of the Ministry of Construction in the time of emperor Minh Mạng. This remarkable work was prepared in 10 years (1809–1819) and consisted of 10 volumes. One of them, the Địa Dư Chí volume, details territories of Dai Nam Kingdom. In 1838, he published the Đại Nam Thống Nhất Toàn Đồ, the Unified Đại Nam Complete Map, that distinctly delineated Vạn Lý Trường Sa (the Ten-thousand-league Long Sandbank) and Hoàng Sa (the Golden Sandbank).
 In 1827, a world atlas produced by Belgian geographer Philippe Vandermaelen was published in Belgium. Vietnam was described by four maps in this atlas. One of these maps has the title "Partie de la Cochinchine", in which Paracel Islands was included, indicating that it was part of Cochinchine (southern Vietnam region). The map also featured geography, politics, minerals and statistics about the Empire of An Nam (former name of Vietnam). Moreover, the map titled "Partie de la Chine" in the atlas had identified Hainan Island as the southernmost point of China at that time.
 In 1833, Emperor Minh Mạng ordered the Ministry of Construction to build a temple, erect steles, and plant many trees on the islands for navigation purposes.
 In 1834, Emperor Minh Mạng ordered Trương Phúc Sĩ, a naval task unit commander, accompanied by 21 men sailing to the islands to survey and draw map of Hoàng Sa.
 In 1835, Emperor Minh Mạng issued a royal ordinance to order 24 troops to the Paracel Islands. The royal ordinance has been preserved by generations of Đặng family and was publicly disclosed in early 2009.
 In 1835, the King ordered Phạm Văn Nguyên's naval task unit, accompanied by workers from Bình Định and Quãng Ngãi provinces, to build Hoàng Sa temple with a wind screen and erect steles on Bàn Than Thạch (Bàn Than Rock) of the present-day Woody Island. The mission was completed in 10 days. Notably, about 33m southwest from the erection, there was a little ancient temple where a stele engraved with the words "Vạn Lý Ba Bình" found. This inscription means Ten Thousand Leagues of Calming Waves. The date of the actual erection of the ancient temple remains unknown
 In 1836, Emperor Minh Mạng received a report from his Ministry of Construction that recommended a comprehensive survey of all the East Sea islands because of their "great strategic importance to our maritime borders." The King ordered Phạm Hữu Nhật, a royal navy commander, to erect a wooden stele on the islands. The post was engraved with the following inscription: The 17th of the reign of Minh Mạng by the royal ordinance commander of the navy Phạm Hữu Nhật came here to Hoàng Sa for reconnaissance to make topographical measurements and leave this stele as record thereof.
 In 1838, Bishop Jean-Louis Taberd published the "Latin-Annamese Dictionary". The dictionary contains the "An Nam Đại Quốc Họa Đồ" (The Great Annam Map). In the neighborhood of the present-day coordinate of the islands, words found on the map read "Paracel seu Cát Vàng" (Paracel or Cát Vàng). Cát Vàng means Hoàng Sa, Golden Sands or Golden Sandbank.
 In 1842, Hai Lu Do Chi, a historical Chinese document was written in the 22nd year of the reign of the Daoguang Emperor (1820–1850) of the Qing dynasty (1644 to 1912) of China. A statement found in this book read: Wang Li Shi Tang (万里石塘) is a sandbank rising above the sea. Several thousand leagues in length, it forms a rampart on the periphery of the Kingdom of Annam. Wang Li Shi Tang means Ten-thousand-league Long Sandbank.
 In 1858, Napoleon III ordered French troops to attack Tourane, the present-day Đà Nẳng city. Subsequently, France launched more attacks and forced Cochin China and some provinces in the South to become her colonies. French Indochina was formed in 1887 and consisted of Tonkin, Annam, Cochin China, and Cambodia.
 The 1887 Chinese-Vietnamese Boundary Convention signed between France and China after the Sino-French War, which, according to China, put the islands in the Chinese territory. In fact, the treaty only clarified Gulf of Tonkin sea border and other land border issues between Vietnam and China.
 1895–1896, German vessel Bellona and Japanese ship Himeji Maru sank at the islands. Chinese fishermen looted and resold them at Hainan. These countries protested but local Chinese authorities, the Governor of Liang Guang, denied any responsibilities on the ground that the Paracels were abandoned and belonged to neither country.

China

618–1279 

There are some Chinese cultural relics in the Paracel islands dating from the Tang and Song eras, and there is some evidence of Chinese habitation on the islands during these periods. According to the Wujing Zongyao, a book published in the Northern Song dynasty in 1044, the Song government then included the Islands in the patrol areas of the Navy of the Court.

1279–1368 
In 1279, the Yuan dynasty emperor sent the high-level official and astronomer, Guo Shoujing, to the South China Sea to survey and measure the islands and the surrounding sea area. Guo's base of survey was claimed by China to be located in the Paracel Islands, although this is considered unlikely by many Chinese scholars. His activities were recorded in the Yuan Shi, or History of Yuan. According to the Yuan Shi, the South China Sea islands were within the boundary of the Yuan dynasty. Maps published in the Yuan era invariably included the Changsha (the Paracels) and the Shitang (the Spratlys) within the domain of Yuan.

1368–1912 
Relevant local annals and other historic materials of the Ming (1368–1644) and the Qing (1644–1912) dynasties continued to make reference to the South China Sea islands as China's territory. The Qiongzhou Prefecture (the highest administrative authority in Hainan), exercised jurisdiction over the Paracel and Spratly Islands in the Ming and Qing Dynasties.

In the 19th century, Europeans found that Chinese fishermen from Hainan annually sojourned on the Paracel and Spratly Islands for part of the year. For three months each year between 1881 and 1884, the German Imperial Navy sent two boats (the ship Freya and the warship Iltis) to study and map the Paracel Islands without either seeking the permission of or incurring protest by the Chinese government. This mission was finished without any problems and the German Admiralty published the results in 1885 in a document called "Die Paracel-Inseln" (The Paracel Islands).

In 1909, Zhang Renjun, the Viceroy of Liangguang, ordered Guangdong Fleet Admiral Li Zhun to sail to the Paracel Islands. In June, with over 170 sailors in three warships named Fubo, Guangjin and Shenhang, he inspected 15 islands, erected stone tablets engraved with each island's name, raised China's flag and fired cannons to declare the islands "sacred territory of China", which France did not protest. In 1910, the Qing government decided to invite Chinese merchants to contract for the administration of the development affairs of the South China Sea islands, and demanded that officials shall provide protection and maintenance in order to highlight Chinese territory and protect its titles and interests.

1912–1950s 
After the fall of the Qing dynasty, the new Government of Guangdong Province decided to place the Paracel Islands under the jurisdiction of the Ya Xian County of Hainan Prefecture in 1911. The Southern Military Government in 1921 reaffirmed the 1911 decision. China continued to exercise authority over the South China Sea islands by such means as granting licenses or contracts to private Chinese merchants for the development and exploitation of guano and other resources on those islands and protesting against foreign nations' claims, occupations, and other activities. For example, in May 1928, the Guangdong provincial government sent a naval vessel, the Hai-jui, with an investigation team organized by the provincial government and Sun Yat-Sen University to investigate and survey the islets, after which the investigation team produced a detailed Report of Surveys on the Paracel Islands.

On July27, 1932, the Chinese Foreign Ministry instructed the Chinese Envoy to France to lodge a diplomatic protest to the French Foreign Ministry and to deny France's claims to the Paracel Islands. On November 30 of the same year, Zhu Zhaoshen, a high-level inspection official of the Chinese Foreign Ministry, issued public correspondence Number 66 to the French Consul in Guangzhou, reiterating that "it is absolutely beyond doubt that the Xisha [Paracel] Islands fall within the boundary of China". Despite repeated Chinese protests, French troops, who had colonized French Indochina in the 19th century, invaded and occupied the Paracel Islands on July 3, 1938. This took place shortly after the breakout of the Second Sino-Japanese War, when the armed forces of China and Japan were busy elsewhere. Three days later, on July 6, the Japanese Foreign Ministry also issued a declaration in protest of the French occupation 

During the Second World War, the Japanese expelled the French troops and took over the islands in spite of the 1938 declarations. The Spratlys and the Paracels were conquered by Japan in 1939. Japan administered the Spratlys via Taiwan's jurisdiction and the Paracels via Hainan's jurisdiction. The Paracels and Spratlys were handed over to Republic of China control after the 1945 surrender of Japan, since the Allied powers had assigned the Republic of China to receive Japanese surrenders in that area. At the end of the war (Asian-Pacific Region), Nationalist China formally retook the Paracels, Spratlys and other islands in the South China Sea in October and November 1946. In the Geneva accord of 1954 Japan formally renounced all of its claims to, inter alia, the South China Sea islands which it had occupied during the World War II. After WW2 ended, the Republic of China was the "most active claimant". The Republic of China then garrisoned Woody Island in the Paracels in 1946 and posted Chinese flags and markers on it; France tried, but failed, to make them leave Woody island. The aim of the Republic of China was to block the French claims. In December 1947, the Republic of China drew up a map showing its eleven-dotted line U shaped claim to the entire South China Sea, including the Spratly and Paracel Islands as Chinese territory.

20th-century events 
In the 1910-20s, the French Ministry of Colonies and the Ministry of Foreign Affairs agreed that the Paracel Islands were under Chinese sovereignty, and that France should not try to claim them, either on behalf of itself, or Annam. Therefore, France did not protest in 1921 when the government of Guangdong province declared the Paracels to be under the administration of Hainan Island. 5 years later in 1926, France refused an application from a French company to exploit guano in the Paracels. It also refused a similar application from a Japanese company.
 In 1932, France nonetheless formally claimed both the Paracel and Spratly Islands.  China and Japan both protested.  On 6 April 1933, France occupied the Spratlys, announced their annexation, formally included them in French Indochina, and built a couple of weather stations on them.
 On 3 July 1938, French Indochinese colonial troops, headed by sub-lieutenant Edmond Grethen, occupy the Paracels islands in turn.
 In March 1939 Japan took the islands from France, garrisoned them, and built a submarine base at Itu Aba (now Taiping / 太平) Island. In 1941, the Japanese Empire made the Paracel and Spratly islands part of Taiwan, then under its rule.
 After World War II, Nationalist China reaffirmed its sovereignty over the islands in the South China Sea, and dispatched a patrol force to the islands, but this was challenged by the French.
 After the fall of the nationalist regime in China in 1949, the PRC gained control of the eastern half of the Paracel islands. Several small clashes occurred between the French and the communist Chinese naval forces during this period, but eventually a de facto line of control was established with the PRC occupying Woody Island, while the remainder was held by Franco -Vietnamese forces.
 In 1951, at the international Treaty of San Francisco conference, Vietnam's representative claimed that both the Paracels and Spratlys are territories of Vietnam, and was met with no challenge from all nations at the event. However, neither the PRC nor the ROC participated in the conference. Separately, the ROC negotiated and signed its own treaty with Japan regarding the islands on April 29, 1952.
 In 1954, according to the Geneva Agreements, which were signed by a number of nations including the PRC, Vietnam was partitioned into two states, North Vietnam and South Vietnam. The 17th parallel was used as the provisional military demarcation line, which was effectively extended into the territorial waters. 
 In 1956, after the French withdrawal from Vietnam, South Vietnam replaced French control of the islands. By February 1956, the South Vietnamese Navy was already stationed on Pattle Island by Ngô Đình Diệm, though both the PRC and ROC politically and diplomatically condemned the decision and reaffirmed their claims to the islands. Following on the former French claim, Vietnam claimed the entire Paracel Islands, 
 On September 4, 1958, the government of the PRC proclaimed the breadth of its territorial sea to be twelve nautical miles (22 km) which applied to all its territory, including the Paracel and Spratly Islands. Ten days later, the prime minister of North Vietnam, Phạm Văn Đồng, in his letter to Zhou Enlai stated that his government had respected the declaration of the PRC government. The PRC government used this letter as justification for their occupation, in fact, according to PhD Nguyen Van Canh: "The note of a prime minister, that is, the executive, is just an administrative document in the field of diplomacy, and in the matter of territorial transfers, the constitutions of countries stipulate that there must be a treaty regulating the transfer of territory and determine that problem. In other words, the National Assembly decides on that issue, and the National Assembly reflects the will of the entire people when transferring territory."   
  On January 19, 1974, the Battle of the Paracel Islands between the PRC and South Vietnam took place, leaving the PRC in control of the entire archipelago. On January 16, South Vietnamese naval officers and an American observer had reported to Saigon some suspected military activities of the Chinese navy on the Drummond and Duncan islands. After receiving the report, the government of South Vietnam decided to counter the Chinese forces, to defend the South Vietnamese-controlled section (the western half of the Paracels) from Chinese occupation, and sent a unit of frigates to the area. On January 19, there were sea and land battles between the Chinese and Vietnamese forces with casualties on both sides. At the end, the Chinese fleet defeated the naval force of South Vietnam. With the ongoing civil war with the Viet Cong embroiling South Vietnam's attention and the absence of the USA's support, no military attempt was made to re-engage the PRC over the islands. After the military engagement and the subsequent victory, the PRC gained the entire archipelago and has taken control of Paracel Islands ever since. It was a significant turning point for the PRC but the sovereignty dispute on the islands remains unresolved with Vietnam.
 In 1982, Vietnam established Hoang Sa District in Quang Nam-Da Nang covering these islands.
 In a statement released on 13 July 1999 by the foreign ministry of Taiwan, under President Lee Teng-hui stated that "legally, historically, geographically, or in reality", all of the South China Sea and the islands were Taiwan's territory and under Taiwanese sovereignty. The ROC's and the PRC's claims "mirror" each other. Taiwan and China are largely strategically aligned on the islands issue, since they both claim exactly the same area, so Taiwan's claims are viewed as an extension of China's claims. Taiwan and China both claim the entire island chains, while all the other claimants only claim portions of them, and China has proposed cooperation with Taiwan against all the other countries claiming the islands, such as Vietnam. China has urged Taiwan to cooperate and offered Taiwan a share in oil and gas resources while shutting out all the other rival claimants. Board director Chiu Yi of Taiwan's state run oil company, CPC Corp, has named Vietnam as the "greatest threat" to Taiwan. The United States has regularly ignored Taiwan's claims in the South China Sea and does not include Taiwan in any talks on dispute resolution for the area.

21st-century events and land reclamation 
In July 2012 the National Assembly of Vietnam passed a law demarcating Vietnamese sea borders to include the Paracel and Spratly Islands.

The Philippines and Vietnam promptly lodged diplomatic protests strongly opposing the establishment of the Sansha City under Chinese jurisdiction.

In April 2013, a representative from the Vietnamese Foreign Ministry’s National Boundary Commission gave a diplomatic note to a representative of the Chinese Embassy in Hanoi demanding that China cancel its plan to bring tourists to the Paracel archipelago.

According to reports from Chinese state media, at the beginning of May 2014, Chinese and Vietnamese naval vessels collided near the islands as Hanoi sought to prevent a Chinese oil rig from setting up in the area. On May 26, a Vietnamese fishing boat sank near the oil rig, after colliding with a Chinese vessel. As both sides imputed the blame to each other, Vietnam released a video footage in a week later, showing a Chinese vessel ramming into its ship before it sank; the Chinese said they were on the defensive while Vietnamese vessels were attacking the Chinese fishing boats.

On May 9, 2014, Taiwan reiterated its claim to the Paracel islands, rejecting all rival claims amidst the standoff and repeating its position that all of the Paracel Islands, Spratly Islands, Macclesfield Bank and Pratas Islands belong to the Republic of China along with "their surrounding waters and respective seabed and subsoil", and that Taiwan views both Vietnam and mainland China's claims as illegitimate.  This statement was released by Taiwan's Ministry of Foreign Affairs, which added – "There is no doubt that the Republic of China has sovereignty over the archipelagos and waters."
In January 2016, photographs emerged that indicate that China is reclaiming land and expanding military facilities in the Paracels, including at Duncan Island, North Island, and Tree Island. Commentators have likened this work to the initial stages of China's large-scale construction in the Spratly Islands.
 On July 12, 2016, an arbitration under the United Nations Convention on the Law of the Sea (UNCLOS) backed the Philippines against China's claims of resources and maritime areas within the nine-dash line that exceeded its entitlements under the UNCLOS. The tribunal argued that China had not historically exercised exclusive control within, hence has "no legal basis" to claim "historic rights" over resources. The ruling was rejected by both China and Taiwan.
 In February 2017, the AMTI project under the Center for Strategic and International Studies reported that Chinese authorities had carried out land reclamation on 20 reefs, thus establishing 20 Chinese outposts so far. These include Duncan Island and Drummond Island which also have small helipads. Of these, three were capable of berthing small naval and commercial merchant ships. Vietnam had responded to this by expanding its already existing facilities on some of the Spratly islands occupied by it.

In popular culture 
 The film Storm in the South China Sea was produced in China in 1976, showing the Battle of the Paracel Islands in 1974.
 Battlefield 4, a 2013 first-person shooter video game, includes a map based on the Paracel Islands, titled "Paracel Storm".

United States FIPS country code 
The United States FIPS 10-4 country code for the Paracel Islands is PF.

See also

 Great Wall of Sand
 Spratly Islands

Notes

References

Citations

Sources 

 (1686) Do Ba Cong Dao (translated by Buu Cam), "Toan Tap Thien Nam Tu Chí Lo Do Thu ", Hong Duc Ban Do, Saigon, 1962.
 (1776) Le Quí Don (translated by Le Xuan Giao), "Phu Bien Tap Luc", Saigon, 1972.
 (1821) Phan Huy Chu (translated by Nguyen Tho Duc), "Lich Trieu Hien Chuong Loai Chí", Saigon, 1972.
 (1837) Jean Louis TABERD, "Note on the Geography of Cochinchina", Journal of the Royal Asiatic Society of Bengal, Calcutta, Vol. VI, 9/1837.
 (1838) Jean Louis TABERD, "Additional Notice on the Geography of Cochinchina", Journal of the Royal Asiatic Society of Bengal, Calcutta, Vol. VII, 4/1838, pp 317–324.
 (1849) GUTZLAFF, "Geography of the Cochinchinese Empire", Journal of The Geographical Society of London, vol the 19th, p. 93.
 (1999) Vietnamese Claims to the Truong Sa Archipelago. Todd C. Kelly, August 1999.
  p. 9 p. 11
  p. 74 p. 76
 (2017) 
 (????) Dr. Phan Van Hoang's historical and geographical analysis on Vietnam and China's claims on the Paracels – Vietnamese language link

Further reading 
Menon, Rajan, "Worry about Asia, Not Europe", The National Interest, Sept–Oct 2012 Issue, September 11, 2012

 (in Vietnam, Que Huong-series 2-episode 1)

External links 

 CIA World Factbook for Paracel Islands
 Territorial claims in the Spratly and Paracel Islands
 
 
 
 

 
Archipelagoes of the Pacific Ocean
Archipelagoes of Southeast Asia
Maritime Southeast Asia
Disputed islands
Disputed territories in Southeast Asia
Territorial disputes of China
Territorial disputes of the Republic of China
Territorial disputes of Vietnam
Archipelagoes of China
Archipelagoes of Taiwan
Archipelagoes of Vietnam